Chaloupka (feminine Chaloupková) is a Czech surname meaning "little cottage". People with the surname include:

 Eva Chaloupková, Czech swimmer
 Frank Chaloupka, American health economist
 George Chaloupka (1932–2011), Czechoslovak-born Australian anthropologist
 Pavel Chaloupka (born 1959), Czech footballer
 Petr Chaloupka (born 1985), Czech ice hockey player

See also
Chalupka

Czech-language surnames